Tecla Chebet Tum is a Kenyan politician who is currently a member of the National Assembly as county woman representative for Nandi County. She is a member of the Jubilee Party.

She studied at University of Nairobi, Moi University and Denver University and worked at Moi University as a lecturer before her election to the National Assembly in 2017. She is a member of the Departmental Committee on Administration & National Security and the Departmental Committee on Sports, Tourism & Culture.

Election results

References

Kenyan politicians
University of Nairobi alumni
Moi University alumni
University of Denver alumni
Academic staff of Moi University
Year of birth missing (living people)
Living people